The peryton is a mythical creature with features of a stag and a bird.

Peryton may also refer to:
 Peryton (Dungeons & Dragons), a creature in Dungeons & Dragons
 Peryton (astronomy), a type of Fast Radio Burst that was found to originate in microwave ovens